Wayne Nichols (born 22 June 1978) is an Australian comic book artist, best known for his work in the American comic book industry illustrating titles for Marvel Comics (The Incredible Hulk, Exiles), IDW Publishing (Orphan Black, The X-Files) and Dark Horse Comics (Star Wars: The Force Unleashed, Falling Skies).

Wayne has also contributed illustration, concept art and storyboards for a list of leading Australian and International clients including H&M, Apple Music, MTV, Jacobs Creek, Crown Casino, Coca-Cola, MasterCard, The Australian Air Force and Telstra amongst others.

His large-scale Spider-Man mural was featured in the major exhibition Marvel: Creating the Cinematic Universe at the Queensland Gallery of Modern Art.

References

Australian comics artists
Australian illustrators
1978 births
Living people
Comics creator BLP pop